Frederick William Lord (December 11, 1800 – May 24, 1860) was an American educator, physician, and politician who served one term as a United States representative from New York from 1847 to 1849.

Early life and education 
Born in Lyme, New London County, Connecticut, he attended Lyme Academy and was graduated from Yale College in 1821. He was a professor of mathematics in Washington College (in Chestertown, Maryland) for two years and was in charge of an academy at Baltimore for three years. He studied medicine in Baltimore and was graduated in medicine from Yale College in 1828; he commenced the practice of medicine in Sag Harbor, New York, continuing in his profession there for fifteen years.

Career 
Lord was a delegate to the Whig National Convention at Harrisburg, Pennsylvania, in 1840, and moved to Greenport in 1846 and engaged in agricultural pursuits and the cultivation of fruit and ornamental trees. He was elected as a Democrat to the Thirtieth Congress, holding office from March 4, 1847, to March 3, 1849.

He resumed his former pursuits in Greenport and was an unsuccessful candidate for election in 1854 to the Thirty-fourth Congress and in 1856 to the Thirty-fifth Congress.

Congress and death 
He was elected a delegate to the Republican National Convention at Chicago in 1860, but on his way to attend the convention was taken ill on the steamer Massachusetts, and died in New York City. Interment was in East Hampton Cemetery, East Hampton.

References

1800 births
1860 deaths
People from Lyme, Connecticut
People from Greenport, Suffolk County, New York
Yale School of Medicine alumni
19th-century American physicians
Politicians from Suffolk County, New York
People from Sag Harbor, New York
Democratic Party members of the United States House of Representatives from New York (state)
19th-century American politicians
Yale College alumni